The 2011 Internationaux Féminins de la Vienne was a professional tennis tournament played on hard courts. It was the eleventh edition of the tournament which was part of the 2011 ITF Women's Circuit. It took place in Poitiers, France between 24 and 30 October 2011.

WTA entrants

Seeds

 1 Rankings are as of October 17, 2011.

Other entrants
The following players received wildcards into the singles main draw:
  Julie Coin
  Victoria Larrière
  Irena Pavlovic
  Irina Ramialison

The following players received entry from the qualifying draw:
  Nastassya Burnett
  Mădălina Gojnea
  Anne Kremer
  Patrycja Sanduska

The following player received entry from a Lucky loser spot:
  Magda Linette

Champions

Singles

 Kimiko Date-Krumm def.  Elena Baltacha, 7–6(7–3), 6–4

Doubles

 Alizé Cornet /  Virginie Razzano def.  Maria Kondratieva /  Sophie Lefèvre, 6–3, 6–2

External links
Official Website
ITF Search 

2011 ITF Women's Circuit
2011
2011 in French tennis